George Henry Emerson (1798 – July 3, 1889) was a lawyer and political figure in Newfoundland. He represented Twillingate and Fogo in the Newfoundland and Labrador House of Assembly from 1848 to 1855.

He was born in Windsor, Nova Scotia and came to Newfoundland in 1830. Emerson was called to the bar in 1831. He served as a member of the Legislative Council from 1855 to 1859, serving as solicitor general from 1855 to 1857. Emerson died in St. John's in 1889.

His son Prescott and his brother Hugh were also lawyers and both served in the Newfoundland assembly.

References 
 

Members of the Newfoundland and Labrador House of Assembly
Members of the Legislative Council of Newfoundland
1798 births
1889 deaths
People from Windsor, Nova Scotia
Newfoundland Colony people